Michał Trąbka (born 22 April 1997) is a Polish professional footballer who plays as a midfielder for ŁKS Łódź.

Career

In 2018, he signed for Stal Stalowa Wola. As a ŁKS Łódź footballer, he played 30 games in the Poland top-tier Ekstraklasa, and scored his only goal of the season in the match against Raków Częstochowa.

References

Polish footballers
1997 births
Living people
Association football midfielders
Rozwój Katowice players
Gryf Wejherowo players
Stal Stalowa Wola players
ŁKS Łódź players
Ekstraklasa players
I liga players
II liga players
III liga players
Sportspeople from Ruda Śląska